This is a list of listed buildings in Guldborgsund Municipality, Denmark.

The list

4800 Nykøbing F

4840 Nørre Alslev

4850 Stubbekøbing

4863 Eskilstrup

4871 Horbelev

4873 Væggerløse

4874 Gedser

4880 Nysted

4990 Sakskøbing

4891 Toreby L

4930 Maribo

Delisted buildings

References

External links

 Danish Agency of Culture

 
Guldborgsund